Hyundai's Kappa automobile engine series consists of three-cylinder and four-cylinder models.

Kappa
The Kappa engine series are gasoline powered, all-aluminum block and utilizes a 16-valve design with DOHC as opposed to the 12-valve design SOHC of its Epsilon engine family predecessor.

1.2 L (G4LA) 
The  is a destroked variant of the Kappa G4LA engine produced in India to circumvent the 1,200 cc tax bracket.

Applications

 Hyundai i10 (PA) (2008–2010)
 Hyundai i20 (PB) (2008–2012)

1.25 L (G4LA) 
The  is the European version. Engine output figures varies depending on application and target market.

Applications

 Hyundai i10 (PA) (2008–2013)
 Hyundai i20 (PB) (2008–2014)
 Kia Picanto/Morning (SA) (2008–2011)

1.4 L

Kappa II MPi
Main improvement is adding VVT (variable valve timing) to the engine.

1.0 L MPI (G3LA) 

Applications

 Hyundai Eon (HA) (2011–2019)
 Hyundai Grand i10 (BA) (2013–present)
 Hyundai Grand i10 (AI3) (2019–present)
 Hyundai HB20 (HB) (2012–2019)
 Hyundai i10 (PA) (2010–2013)
Hyundai i10 (IA) (2013–2019)
 Hyundai i10 (AC3) (2019–present)
 Kia Picanto/Morning (TA) (2011–2017)
 Kia Picanto/Morning (JA) (2017–present)
 Kia Ray (TAM) (2011–present)

1.0 L FLEX (F3LA) 
Flex fuel compatible version of the 1.0 MPi engine.

Applications

 Hyundai HB20 (BR2) (2019–present)
 Kia Picanto/Morning (JA) (2018–2019)

1.0 L TCI/T-MPi (G3LB) 

Applications
 Kia Picanto/Morning (TA) (2015–2017)
Kia Ray (TAM) (2012–2017)

1.0 L Turbo FLEX (F3LB) 
Flex fuel compatible version of the 1.0 TCi engine.

Applications

 Hyundai HB20

1.2 L (G4LA) 

The  is a destroked variant of the Kappa II G4LA engine produced in India to circumvent the 1,200 cc tax bracket.

Applications

 Hyundai Aura (AI3) (2020–present)
 Hyundai Grand i10 (BA) (2013–present)
 Hyundai Grand i10 (AI3) (2019–present)
 Hyundai i10 (PA) (2010–2016)
 Hyundai i10 (AC3) (2019–present)
 Hyundai i20 (PB) (2012–2015)
 Hyundai i20 (IB) (2014–2020)
 Hyundai i20 (BI3) (2020–present)
 Hyundai Venue (QXi) (2019–present)
 Hyundai Xcent (BA) (2014–present)

1.25 L (G4LA) 

The  is the European version.

Applications

Hyundai i10 (PA) facelift (2010–2014)
 Hyundai i10 (IA) (2013–2019)
 Hyundai i20 (GB) (2014–2020)
 Kia Picanto (TA) (2011–2017)
 Kia Picanto (JA) (2017–present)
 Kia Rio (UB) (2011–2017)
 Kia Rio (YB) (2017–present)
Kia Stonic (YB) (2017–present)

1.4 L (G4LC) 

Applications

 Hyundai Accent/Verna/Solaris (RB/RC) (2011–2017)
Hyundai Accent/Verna/Solaris (HC/YC) (2017–present)
Hyundai Bayon (BC3 CUV) (2021–present) 
Hyundai Celesta (ID) (2017–present)
Hyundai i20 (GB) (2014–2020)
Hyundai i20 (BI3) (2020–present)
Hyundai i30 (PD) (2016–present)
Hyundai Reina (CB) (2017–2021)
Kia Pegas/Soluto (AB) (2017–present)
Kia Rio/K2 (UB) (2011–2017)
Kia Rio/K2/KX Cross (FB) (2017–present)
Kia Stonic/KX1 (YB CUV) (2017–present)

Kappa II GDi

1.0 T-GDi (G3LC) 

A detuned version that makes  between 4,500 and 6,000 rpm is also available for some applications.

Applications
Hyundai Accent/Verna (HCi) (2020–present)
Hyundai Aura (AI3) (2020–present, detuned)
Hyundai Casper (AX1) (2021–present, detuned)
Hyundai Grand i10 (AI3) (2019–present, detuned)
Hyundai HB20 (BR2) (2019–present)
Hyundai i10 (AC3) (2019–present, detuned)
Hyundai i20 (GB) (2014–2020)
Hyundai i20 (BI3) (2020–present)
Hyundai i30 (PD) (2016–present)
Hyundai Kona (OS) (2017–2020)
Hyundai Venue (QXi) (2019–present)
Kia cee'd (JD) (2012–2018)
Kia Ceed (CD) (2018–present)
Kia Picanto (JA) (2017–present, detuned)
Kia Rio (YB) (2017–present)
Kia Sonet (QY) (2020–present)
Kia Stonic (YB) (2017–present)

1.0 T-GDi FLEX (F3LC) 

Flex fuel compatible version of the 1.0 T-GDi engine.

Applications
Hyundai Creta (SU2) (2021–present)
Hyundai HB20 (BR2) (2019–present)

1.4 T-GDi (G4LD)

Applications
Hyundai Celesta RV (ID) (2018–2019, detuned)
Hyundai Creta (SU2) (2020–present)
Hyundai Elantra (AD) (2016–2020, detuned)
Hyundai i30 (PD) (2016–present)
Hyundai Lafesta (SQ) (2018–present)
Hyundai Veloster (JS) (2018–2020)
Kia Ceed (CD) (2018–present)
Kia K3 (BD) (2018–present)

Kappa II GDi HEV
Announced in 2016 and intended for use in Hybrid applications, main improvements are utilizing Atkinson cycle, higher compression ratio, cooler EGR system and higher pressure fuel system.

1.6 L (G4LE)

The  four-cylinder with a  bore,  stroke and a 13.0:1 compression ratio.

Applications
 Hyundai Ioniq (2016–2022)
 Hyundai Kona Hybrid (OS) (2019–2020)
 Kia Niro (2016–present)

Kappa II LPi
For use in LPG applications.

1.0 L Biofuel (B3LA)

The  three-cylinder.

Applications
 Kia Morning (2011–2017)
 Kia Ray (2011–2017)

1.0 L LPG (L3LA)

The  three-cylinder.

Applications
 Kia Morning (2017–2020)
 Kia Ray (2017–2019)

Development
Developed at a cost of $421 million over a period of 48 months, the Kappa project was aimed at increasing fuel economy while ensuring compliance to stringent EURO-4 emission regulations. The newest versions of Kappa engine family comply with Euro-6DTemp regulations.

Design
The engine block is made from high pressure die-cast aluminum which results in considerable weight savings - the entire engine with a manual gearbox only weighs . The main block features a ladder frame construction for structural stiffness while its cylinders are fitted with cast-iron liners for improved abrasion durability. Additional weight was shaved off by integrating the engine support bracket with the timing chain cover. The shape of the piston skirt was optimized to reduce its size while the compression height of the piston was also reduced, resulting in weight savings. The optimized piston skirt is also treated with molybdenum disulfide. A highly sophisticated process of Physical Vapor Deposition (PVD) is used to apply an ultra-thin layer of Chromium nitride to the piston’s oil ring.  Chromium Nitride-coated piston rings using PVD is an innovative technology borrowed from the Hyundai Tau engine introduced earlier. Friction between the oil ring and cylinder wall has been further minimized by reducing the oil ring tension. The Kappa engine is the first Hyundai engine to be fitted with an accessory drive belt which does not require a mechanical auto-tensioning adjustment device, reducing the hardware and further lowering weight and cost. Because it is designed to maintain an ideal tension setting, the belt runs quieter and with proper preventative maintenance and care, the belt will last . For ignition, the Kappa engine uses a new, longer reach spark plug which enabled engineers to enlarge the size of the water jacket to promote more efficient engine cooling around the critically important spark plug and exhaust port area. The long reach spark plug (M12 thread) also enabled engineers to enlarge the valve diameter for increased airflow and combustion efficiency. A lightweight, heat-resistant engineering plastic was used for the intake manifold. The fuel delivery pipe assembly is a returnless type (to eliminate evaporative fuel emissions) and is made of SUS (steel use stainless) with a specially designed inner structure for the reduction of pulsation noise.

Valvetrain
The valvetrain features a number of innovations: friction reducing roller swing arm, hydraulic lash adjusters which ensure proper clearances between the valve stem and roller swing arm, which significantly reduce valve tapping noise. The valve springs feature a beehive shape and smaller retainer. The reduced weight and spring load further help lower friction and improve fuel economy. The valvetrain is driven by a silent-type, maintenance free steel timing chain that replaces a roller-type timing chain: The optimized design greatly reduces impact forces and noise when the gear tooth and chain engage.

Offset crank
Unlike a conventional engine where the centerline of the cylinder bore is in perfect vertical alignment with the rotating axis of the crankshaft, the Kappa’s centerline is offset by a small distance. This offset minimizes the lateral force created by the rotating piston & rod assembly (known, and audible, as "piston slap" at its extreme). The net effect is an improvement in fuel consumption and a reduction in noise, vibration and harshness - it should also help with engine longevity since reduced lateral force will equal reduced bore wear.

Engine management
Engine management is provided by two 16-bit 32 MHz microprocessors which control and monitor ignition timing, idle speed, knocking and emissions.

References

See also

 List of Hyundai engines

Kappa
Straight-three engines
Straight-four engines
Gasoline engines by model